Tuscarora Creek in Berkeley County, West Virginia, is an  tributary of Opequon Creek, which drains into the Potomac River in the Chesapeake Bay watershed.

Located in the tip of the Mountain State's Eastern Panhandle, Tuscarora Creek flows through the city of Martinsburg before draining into Opequon Creek near the Van Metre Ford Bridge. The stream's headwaters are on the eastern flanks of North Mountain, upstream from Poor House Farm Park.

The creek was named after the Tuscarora Indians.

See also
List of West Virginia rivers

References

Rivers of Berkeley County, West Virginia
Rivers of West Virginia
Tributaries of the Potomac River